Arvidsjaur Airport  is situated  from Arvidsjaur town in Sweden and had 52,681 passengers in 2018.

The runway is longer than most in the northern interior of Sweden, and this allows international charter jet planes. This was a major reason winter car testing was established in the region around Arvidsjaur, now an important part of the local economy.

Airlines and destinations
The following airlines operate regular scheduled and charter flights at Arvidsjaur Airport:

Arvidsjaur Airport is also used for irregular leisure and business charter flights during the European winter season.

Statistics

See also
List of the largest airports in the Nordic countries

References

External links
Official website

Airports in Sweden
Buildings and structures in Norrbotten County